is the first mini-album of Japanese rock band 9mm Parabellum Bullet released on December 8, 2005. The song "Marvelous", as well as "Talking Machine" and "(Teenage) Disaster", were later re-recorded in The World e.p..

Track list

PV
Farther

Personnel
Takuro Sugawara – lead vocals, lyricist, rhythm guitar
Yoshimitsu Taki – backing vocals, lead guitar
Kazuhiko Nakamura – bass guitar, screaming (track 4) 
Chihiro Kamijo – drums

References
 9mm Parabellm Bullet official website 
 9mm Parabellm Bullet online store 

2005 EPs
9mm Parabellum Bullet albums